Aton, ATON or variants thereof may refer to:

People
 Aton Ben-Horin (born 1979), American music executive and record producer
 Aton Edwards (born c. 1962), American expert in the fields of emergency preparedness, self-reliance and sustainable living
 Ayé Aton, American painter, designer, muralist, musician and educator born Robert Underwood (1940–2017)
 Jim Aton (1925–2008), American jazz bassist, pianist, vocalist and composer
 Baron Aton, an abeyant title in the Peerage of England
 Gilbert de Aton, 1st Baron Aton (died 1342)
 William de Aton, 2nd Baron Aton (died 1373)

Businesses
 Aton LLC, a Russian investment bank (mother RUSSIA)
 Aton Resources, a Canadian mining company (Egyptian God)
 ATON GmbH, parent company of EDAG (Engineering + Design AG)

Acronym
Aid to navigation
Uysal–Walker Archive of Turkish Oral Narrative at Texas Tech University

Other uses
 Aten or Aton, the disk of the sun, regarded as a deity in ancient Egyptian religion
 aton, a type of song in Inuit music
 Aton, a character in the game Kya Dark Lineage
 Aton, protagonist in a series of novels by Piers Anthony
 Aechmea 'Aton', a cultivar

See also
 Aten (disambiguation)

ko:아톤